Salvatore Barone (born 13 December 1995) is an American soccer player who plays as a midfielder for New Amsterdam FC in the National Independent Soccer Association (NISA).

Career

Early career
Barone, from an early age played with the Brooklyn Italians youth league. His father, Joe Barone, was the head coach of the Brooklyn Italians senior squad from 2009-10 and then became chairman of the National Premier Soccer League in 2013. Salvatore Barone played high school soccer for Xaverian High School under head coach Carlos Jaguande. Barone then attended St. Francis College, where he played for four years under head coach Tom Giovatto. At St. Francis College Barone helped the Terriers win three NEC men's soccer tournaments and participated in 3 NCAA Tournaments. While at St. Francis College, Barone garnered several individual awards, including: Northeast conference Academic Honor Roll (2013), First Team All-Northeast Conference (2016), NEC Tournament MVP (2016), and NEC Player of the Week (October 17, 2016).

Professional career
While a freshman at St. Francis College in 2013, Barone played for the Brooklyn Italians against the New York Cosmos in the third round of the Lamar Hunt US Open Cup. In 2016, Barone played with the Brooklyn Italians of the National Premier Soccer League and scored 2 goals in 7 starts. After graduation, he also participated in the Brooklyn Italians 2017 preseason. Then on March 24, 2017 it was announced that Barone signed with the New York Cosmos.

2017
On May 20, 2017, Barone made his debut for the New York Cosmos coming on as a second-half substitute at Al-Hilal FC, the reigning champions of the Saudi Professional League. The match was an international exhibition that ended in a 0-0 draw. He made his NASL debut, when he came on as a substitute in the 92nd minute of regulation at Indy Eleven on July 8th.

In April 2021, Barone joined National Independent Soccer Association side New Amsterdam FC ahead of the spring 2021 season.

Career statistics

References

External links
 
 NISA player profile

1995 births
Living people
American soccer players
St. Francis Brooklyn Terriers men's soccer players
New York Cosmos (2010) players
Penn FC players
New York Cosmos B players
Detroit City FC players
New Amsterdam FC players
Association football midfielders
North American Soccer League players
National Premier Soccer League players
National Independent Soccer Association players
Soccer players from New York (state)